Dangerfield's was a comedy club located in the Upper East Side of Manhattan, New York City, United States, and named after comedian Rodney Dangerfield. The club was founded by Rodney Dangerfield and long-time friend Anthony Bevacqua.

The club opened on September 29, 1969. Kenny Burrell, Thelma Houston, and Rodney Dangerfield performed on the opening night, while Milton Berle, Ed McMahon, Joan Rivers, and David Frost were in the audience.

Only headliners performed, with no amateur or open mic nights. Performers have included George Carlin, Jay Leno, Tim Allen, Jerry Seinfeld, Chris Rock, Jim Carrey, Andrew Dice Clay, Dom Irrera, Roseanne Barr, Bill Hicks, Sam Kinison, Bob Nelson, Robert Schimmel and Jeff Foxworthy.

The club was home to HBO comedy specials Rodney Dangerfield put on to showcase young comedians.

The club announced in October 2020 "that after 50 years of continuous operations we will be closing our New York City venue effective immediately", with plans to reopen in another venue "once the Covid-19 crisis passes".

References

External links

1969 establishments in New York City
2020 disestablishments in New York (state)
Event venues established in 1969
Event venues disestablished in 2020
Comedy clubs in Manhattan
Upper East Side
Defunct comedy clubs in the United States